Constantin Virgil Gheorghiu (September 15, 1916 in Războieni, Romania – June 22, 1992 in Paris, France) was a Romanian writer, best known for his 1949 novel, The 25th Hour, first published by Plon in France.

Life
Virgil Gheorghiu was born in Valea Albă, a village in Războieni Commune, Neamț County, in Romania. His father was an Orthodox priest in Petricani. A top student, he attended high school in Chișinău from 1928 to June 1936, after which he studied  philosophy and theology at the University of Bucharest and at  Heidelberg University.

He traveled and stayed in Saudi Arabia to learn the Arabic language and the Arab culture, before writing the biography of prophet Muhammad. The book was translated from Romanian to French and to Persian in Iran and in Urdu in Pakistan; unfortunately, this book was never translated into English. Its Hindi translation was being printed in India and was expected to be available by January 2020, with the Hindi title saying "A prophet you do not know".

Between 1942 and 1943, during the regime of General Ion Antonescu, Gheorghiu served in the Ministry of Foreign Affairs of Romania as an embassy secretary. He went into exile when Soviet troops entered Romania in August 1944. Arrested at the end of World War II by American troops, he eventually settled in France in 1948. A year later, he published the novel Ora 25 (in French: La vingt-cinquième heure; in English: The Twenty-Fifth Hour), written during his captivity.

In 1971 Gheorghiu became Patriarch of the Romanian Orthodox Church in France.

He is buried in the Passy Cemetery, in Paris.

The 25th Hour
Gheorghiu's best-known book depicts the plight of a naive Romanian young farmhand, Johann Moritz, under German, Soviet and American occupation of Central Europe. Johann is sent to a labor camp by a police captain who covets his wife, Suzanna. At first, he is tagged as "Jacob Moritz", a Jew. Then, he and fellow Jewish prisoners escape to Hungary, where he is interned as a citizen of an enemy country. The Hungarian government sends its foreign residents as Hungarian "voluntary workers to Nazi Germany". Later, "Moritz János" is "rescued" by a Nazi officer who determines he is a perfect Aryan specimen, and forces him into service in the Waffen SS as a model for German propaganda. Imprisoned after the war, he is severely beaten by his Russian captors, then put on trial by Allied forces because of his work for the Nazis. Meanwhile, Traian, son of the priest Koruga who employed Moritz in their Romanian village, is a famous novelist and minor diplomat whose first internment comes when he is picked up as an enemy alien by the Yugoslavs. Once imprisoned, the two heroes begin an odyssey of torture and despair.
Traian Koruga is deeply unsettled because what he sees as the machinism and inhumanity of the "Western technical society", where individuals are treated as members of a category. Meanwhile, Koruga is writing a book, "The 25th Hour", about Johann Moritz and the ordeal awaiting mankind. In the end, Traian takes his own life in an American-Polish concentration camp, while Johann is forced by the Americans to choose between either enlisting in the army, just as World War III is about to start, or to be interned in a camp (as well as his family) as a citizen from an enemy country.

The book was published in French translation in 1949 and was not published in Romania until 1991 (first time published in Romania by Editura Omegapres, Bucharest, 1991).

In 1967, Carlo Ponti produced a film based on Gheorghiu's book. The movie was directed by Henri Verneuil, with Anthony Quinn as Johann, Virna Lisi as Suzanna, and Serge Reggiani as Traian.

Works
 Tărâmul celalalt: versuri, Fundația pentru literatură și artă Regele Carol 2, Bucharest, 1938 
 Cântece de faun, Fundația regală pentru literatură și artă, Bucharest, 1940 
 Caligrafie pe zăpadă, Fundația pentru literatură și artă Regele Carol II, Bucharest, 1940 
 Ceasul de rugăciune: poeme, Editura Națională Gh. Mecu, Bucharest, 1942 
 Am luptat în Crimeea, Editura Națională Mecu, Bucharest, 1942 
 Rumänische Märchen, Ähren-Verl, Heidelberg, 1948 
 Ora 25, 1949. La vingt-cinquième heure, Éditions Plon, Paris, 1949 . The twenty-fifth hour (translated from the Romanian by Rita Eldon), Alfred A. Knopf, New York, 1950 
 La seconde chance (translated from the Romanian by Livia Lamoure), Éditions Plon, Paris, 1952 
 L'homme qui voyagea seul (translated from the Romanian by Livia Lamoure), Éditions Plon, Paris, 1954  
 Le peuple des immortels (translated from the Romanian by Livia Lamoure), Éditions Plon, Paris, 1955 
 Les sacrifiés du Danube, Éditions Plon, Paris, 1957 
 Saint Jean bouche d'or (translated from the Romanian by Livia Lamoure), Éditions Plon, Paris, 1957 
 Les mendiants de miracles, Le Livre de Poche, Paris, 1958 
 La cravache, Éditions Plon, Paris, 1960 
 Perahim (translated from the Romanian by Livia Lamoure), Éditions Plon, Paris, 1961 
 La maison de Petrodava (translated from the Romanian by Livia Lamoure), Éditions Plon, 1961 
 La vie de Mahomet (translated from the Romanian by Livia Lamoure), Éditions Plon, 1963. Éditions du Rocher, 1999. 
 Les immortels d'Agapia, 1964.  Éditions Gallimard, 1998 . The immortals of the mountain (translated from the French by Milton Stansbury), Regnery Publishing, Chicago, 1969
 La jeunesse du docteur Luther (translated from the Romanian by Livia Lamoure), Éditions Plon, 1965
 De la vingt-cinquième heure à l'heure éternelle, Éditions Plon, 1965.  Éditions du Rocher, 1990 
 Le meurtre de Kyralessa, 1966.  The Death of Kyralessa (translated from the French by Marika Mihalyi), Regnery Publishing, Chicago, 1968 
 La tunique de peau,  Éditions Plon, 1967 
 La condottiera,  Rombaldi, Collection Le Club de la Femme, 1969
 Pourquoi m'a-t-on appelé Virgil?, Éditions Plon, 1968
 La vie du patriarche Athénagoras,  Éditions Plon, 1969
 L'espionne,  Éditions Plon, 1973.  Éditions du Rocher, 1990  
 Dieu ne reçoit que le dimanche, Éditions Plon, 1975
 Les inconnus de Heidelberg, Éditions Plon, 1977 
 Le grand exterminateur, Éditions Plon, 1978 
 Les amazones du Danube, Éditions Plon, 1978 
 Dieu a Paris,  Éditions Plon, 1980, 
 Mémoires: Le témoin de la vingt-cinquième heure, Éditions Plon, 1986 
 La Condottiera (translated from the original French into English by Inez Fitzgerald Storck), Arouca Press, Waterloo, ON, 2022

References

External links

 Cogs & Machines, Time, November 6, 1950.
 The Bright Side of the Ax, Time, February 24, 1967.
  Review: The Twenty-Fifth Hour, by Isabel Cary Lundberg, Manas, Vol III, no. 31, August 2, 1950

1916 births
1992 deaths
People from Neamț County
Romanian novelists
Romanian male writers
French male novelists
Romanian Orthodox priests
Romanian writers in French
University of Bucharest alumni
Heidelberg University alumni
Romanian diplomats
Romanian expatriates in France
20th-century French novelists
20th-century Eastern Orthodox priests
20th-century French male writers
Burials at Passy Cemetery